C major (or the key of C) is a major scale based on C, consisting of the pitches C, D, E, F, G, A, and B. C major is one of the most common keys used in music. Its key signature has no flats or sharps. Its relative minor is A minor and its parallel minor is C minor.

The C major scale is:

On the piano, the C major scale can be played by playing only the white keys starting on C.

Compositions
Twenty of Joseph Haydn's 106 symphonies are in C major, making it his second most-used key, second to D major. Of the 134 symphonies mistakenly attributed to Haydn that H. C. Robbins Landon lists in his catalog, 33 are in C major, more than any other key. Before the invention of the valves, Haydn did not write trumpet and timpani parts in his symphonies, except those in C major. Landon writes that it wasn't "until 1774 that Haydn uses trumpets and timpani in a key other than C major... and then only sparingly." Most of Haydn's symphonies in C major are labelled "festive" and are of a primarily celebratory mood. Wilfrid Mellers believed that Mozart's Symphony No. 41, written in 'white' C major, "represented the triumph of light". (See also List of symphonies in C major.)

Many masses and settings of the Te Deum in the Classical era were in C major. Mozart and Haydn wrote most of their masses in C major. Gounod (in a review of Sibelius' Third Symphony) said that "only God composes in C major". Six of his own masses are written in C.

Of Franz Schubert's two symphonies in the key, the first is nicknamed the "Little C major" and the second the "Great C major".

Scott Joplin's "The Entertainer" is written in C major.

Many musicians have pointed out that every musical key conjures up specific feelings. This idea is further explored in a radio program called The Signature Series. American popular songwriter Bob Dylan claimed the key of C major to "be the key of strength, but also the key of regret". Sibelius's Symphony No. 7 is in C major and that key was of great importance in his previous symphonies.

Notable examples

 Johann Sebastian Bach
 Toccata, Adagio and Fugue in C major, BWV 564
 Prelude and Fugue in C major, BWV 846
 Cello Suite No. 3, BWV 1009
 Joseph Haydn
 Cello Concerto No. 1 (1761–65)
 Symphony No. 7, Le Midi (1761)
 Symphony No. 60, Il distratto (1774)
 Symphony No. 82, The Bear (1786)
 String Quartet No. 32, The Bird (1781)
 String Quartet No. 62, Emperor (1797–98)
 Mass No. 10, Missa in tempore belli (1796)
 Wolfgang Amadeus Mozart
 12 Variations in C major on the French song "Ah, vous dirai-je, Maman", KV 265
 Concerto for flute and harp, KV 299/297c
 Piano Concerto No. 8, KV 246 ("Lutzow")
 Piano Concerto No. 13, KV 415
 Piano Concerto No. 21, KV 467
 Piano Concerto No. 25, KV 503
 Piano Sonata No. 1, KV 279
 Piano Sonata No. 7, KV 309
 Piano Sonata No. 10, KV 330
 Piano Sonata No. 16, KV 545
 String Quartet No. 19, KV 465 ("Dissonance")
 Symphony No. 16, KV 128
 Symphony No. 22, KV 162
 Symphony No. 28, KV 200
 Symphony No. 34, KV 338
 Symphony No. 36, KV 425 ("Linz")
 Symphony No. 41, KV 551 ("Jupiter")
 Ludwig van Beethoven
 Piano Sonata No. 3, Op. 2, No. 3
 Piano Concerto No. 1, Op. 15
 Symphony No. 1, Op. 21
 Rondo Op. 51, No. 1
 Piano Sonata No. 21, Op. 53 ("Waldstein")
 Triple Concerto for violin, cello, and piano in C major, Op. 56 (1803)
 String Quartet No. 7, Op. 59/1 ("Rasumovsky")
 Mass in C major, Op. 86
 Franz Schubert
 Wanderer Fantasy, Op. 15 D. 760
 Symphony No. 6 (Little)
 Symphony No. 9, D. 944 ("Great")
 String Quintet in C major, D. 956
 Felix Mendelssohn
 Wedding March from A Midsummer Night's Dream
 Frédéric Chopin
 Introduction and Polonaise brillante for cello and piano, Op. 3
 Etude Op. 10 No. 1 "Waterfall"
 Etude Op. 10 No. 7 "Toccata"
 Mazurka Op. 67 No. 3
 Robert Schumann
 Toccata, Op. 7
 Fantasie in C, Op. 17
 Arabeske, Op. 18
 Symphony No. 2, Op. 61
 Georges Bizet: Symphony in C
 Jean Sibelius
 Symphony No. 3, Op. 52 (1907)
 Symphony No. 7, Op. 105 (1924)
 Maurice Ravel: Boléro
 Igor Stravinsky: Symphony in C (1940)
 Sergei Prokofiev
 Piano Concerto No. 3, Op. 26 (1921)
 Symphony No. 4 (original version), Op. 47 (1930)
 Symphony No. 4 (revised version), Op. 112 (1947)
 Dmitri Shostakovich: Symphony No. 7, Op. 60 ("Leningrad")
 Terry Riley: In C
 Duke Ellington: "C Jam Blues"

See also
Key (music)
Major and minor
Chord (music)
Chord names and symbols (popular music)

References

Further reading
 David Wyn Jones, "The Beginning of the Symphony", in A Guide to the Symphony edited by Robert Layton. Oxford University Press.
 H. C. Robbins Landon, Haydn Symphonies, BBC Music Guides 1986 [1966]

External links
 

Musical keys
Major scales